Slave Lake Airport  is located adjacent to Slave Lake, Alberta, Canada.

References

External links

Place to Fly on COPA's Places to Fly airport directory

Certified airports in Alberta